City Park Golf is a historic 18-hole regulation golf course located north of Denver's City Park.  The area is bounded by E. Twenty-sixth Ave., Colorado Blvd., E. Twenty-third Ave., and York St.

It is included as one in a multiple listing of parts of Denver Park and Parkway System. The listing includes four contributing buildings, two contributing structures, and a contributing site.

In November 2018, construction started on a redesign of the golf course that was necessary to help reduce the risk of flooding in the surrounding neighborhoods during heavy rains. The course is scheduled to reopen in 2019.

References

External links
National Register of Historic Places
City Park Golf Course

National Register of Historic Places in Denver
Golf clubs and courses in Colorado
Sports venues in Denver
1913 establishments in Colorado
Historic districts on the National Register of Historic Places in Colorado
Sports venues on the National Register of Historic Places in Colorado
Traditional Native American dwellings
Buildings and structures completed in 1913
Golf clubs and courses on the National Register of Historic Places